Scott Ziehl is an American film director.

Filmography
 2012 - Shadow Witness
 2008 - Exit Speed
 2007 - Saints & Sinners (TV series)
 2006 - Road House 2 (video)
 2005 - Demon Hunter
 2004 - Three Way
 2004 - Cruel Intentions 3 (video) 
 2003 - Earth vs. the Spider (TV movie) 
 2001 - Proximity 
 1998 - Broken Vessels

External links 

American film directors
Living people
Year of birth missing (living people)